HMS Cranstoun (K511) was a  of the British Royal Navy that served in the last two years of World War II. The ship was transferred to the UK under Lend-Lease on 13 November 1943, and named after Captain James Cranstoun, an officer who served in the American Revolutionary and French Revolutionary Wars.

Service history
Cranstoun served as a convoy escort, and was attached to the Nore Command, and then the 19th Escort Group.

The two ships mounted a coordinated attack, with Loch Killin using her Squid anti-submarine mortar three times and Cranstoun her Hedgehog mortar once, to force the U-boat to the surface.  then also joined the attack, as the U-boat was illuminated by the ship's searchlights and fired on with 20 mm and 40 mm guns. U-1063 attempted to escape, but Loch Killin attacked with depth charges and sank her. Only 17 of the crew survived.

Cranstoun was returned to the U.S. Navy on 3 December 1945, struck from the Navy List on 7 February 1946, and sold for scrapping on 20 November 1947.

References

1943 ships
Ships built in Hingham, Massachusetts
Captain-class frigates
Buckley-class destroyer escorts
World War II frigates of the United Kingdom